Žilavka is a white wine grape variety planted primarily in the Mostar region of Herzegovina, the southern area of Bosnia and Herzegovina. As a varietal wine, Žilavka is known for its bright freshness and acidity.  Ideal for general meal pairings, it is often oak aged as a "barrique" vintage that present more full bodied and earthy wines with nutty aspects that were more prevalent in the wines produced in the early 2000s and before. 

Widely planted throughout the former Yugoslavia, Žilavka used to only be a minor blending grape that was used throughout the former country.  These days, the wine has come into its own and is bottled as a single varietal alongside the other main grape of Herzegovina wine production, Blatina. 

Production is generally focused in the area south of Mostar around the villages of Čitluk, Međugorje, Ljubuški, and Čapljina with notable producers such as Nuić, Škegro, Brkić, Vinarija Čitluk, Zadro and Vitai/Gangaš.

Synonyms
Žilavka is also known under the synonyms Mostarska, Mostarska Žilavka, Zhelavka Biella, Žilava Hercegovačka, Zilavka, Žilavka Bijela, and Žilavka Mostarska.

References

White wine grape varieties
Bosnia and Herzegovina cuisine
Grape varieties of Bosnia and Herzegovina
Wines of Bosnia and Herzegovina